Lake Daisy is a natural freshwater lake on the east side of Winter Haven, Florida. It has a somewhat oval shape and has a  surface area. On all but its northeast shore it is bordered by residential areas. On the northeast is a residential area that has been only about one-tenth completed. On the northwest of Lake Daisy is a short canal that connects it to the tiny Lake Doll.

Lake Daisy has no public swimming areas. The lake contains largemouth bass, bluegill and crappie.

References

Daisy